Bukowe-Klęskowo is a municipal neighbourhood of the city of Szczecin, Poland situated on the right bank of Oder river, south-east of the Szczecin Old Town, and Middle Town. As of April 2011 it had a population of 14,441.

Bukowe-Klęskowo comprises Bukowe and Klęskowo.

References 

Neighbourhoods of Szczecin